The Kingston Bridge in the settlement of Kingston, Franklin Township in Somerset County, New Jersey, is the county's oldest bridge.  It used to carry New Jersey Route 27 over the Millstone River. It is part of the Kingston Mill Historic District, listed on the National Register of Historic Places since 1986.

A previous bridge at the site was destroyed during the American Revolutionary War to halt advancing British troops. The bridge was rebuilt in 1798.

See also
List of bridges on the National Register of Historic Places in New Jersey

References

External links

Road bridges on the National Register of Historic Places in New Jersey
Franklin Township, Somerset County, New Jersey
Lincoln Highway
Historic district contributing properties in New Jersey
National Register of Historic Places in Somerset County, New Jersey
Stone arch bridges in the United States
Bridges in Somerset County, New Jersey